The River City Rhythm Drum and Bugle Corps is an Open Class competitive junior drum and bugle corps, based in Anoka, Minnesota. River City Rhythm performs in Drum Corps International (DCI) competitions.

History

River City Rhythm began as a competitive drum line, founded in Big Lake, Minnesota in 2009 to compete in the Minnesota Percussion Association (MPA) and Winter Guard International (WGI). The unit has won the MPA Independent A Class Championship in 2010–11 and the MPA Independent Open Class Championship in 2013–16 and 2018–19. They have been WGI Independent A Class World Champion Finalists in 2010–11, WGI Independent Open Class World Champion Finalists in 2012–16, and named WGI Independent Open Class Fan Favorites in 2012–15.

The organization relocated to Champlin, Minnesota in the Minneapolis–Saint Paul area during the winter of 2011-12.

In 2014, the organization announced its intent to field a drum and bugle corps to compete in Drum Corps International (DCI) beginning in 2015.  While the management was laying the groundwork for starting a new corps, the drum line was one of seventeen that took part in the DrumLine Battle competition in Indianapolis during the 2014 DCI World Championships. In January 2015, DCI announced that River City Rhythm was one of five corps being evaluated for possible inclusion in DCI Open Class competition for 2015. In May 2015, following a period of evaluation of the unit's finances, staffing, and tour plans by DCI's staff, River City Rhythm was added to the list of competing Open Class corps. The corps was added to DCI's summer schedule for four shows in Minnesota and Iowa in preparation for the corps' first appearance at the DCI Open Class World Championship Prelims in Michigan City, Indiana.

Sponsorship
River City Rhythm is a 501 (c)(3) musical organization. The organization is the sponsor of the River City Rhythm Drum and Bugle Corps, the River City Rhythm Indoor Drumline, and the Lux Winterguard. Bojan Hoover is the Executive Director, Beau Hansen is the Director of Operations, and Devon Lawrence is the corps director.

Show summary (2015–2022)
Source=

References

External links
 

Drum Corps International Open Class corps
Musical groups established in 2009
Organizations based in Minnesota
2009 establishments in Minnesota
Anoka, Minnesota